Delahaye was a family-owned automobile manufacturing company, founded by Émile Delahaye in 1894 in Tours, France. Manufacturing was moved to Paris following incorporation with two unrelated brothers-in-law as equal partners in 1898. The company built a low volume line of limited production luxury cars with coachbuilt bodies; trucks; utility and commercial vehicles; busses; and fire-trucks. Delahaye made a number of technical innovations in its early years; and, after establishing a racing department in 1932, the company came to particular prominence in France in the mid-to-late 1930s, with its Type 138, Type 135SC, and type 145 cars winning numerous races, and setting International records. The company faced setbacks due to the Second World War, and was taken over by amalgamation with arch competitor Hotchkiss in 1954. Both were taken over by the Brandt organization, within mere months, with automotive product manufacturing ended.

History

Formative years
Engineer Émile Delahaye began experimenting with belt-driven cars in 1894, while he was manager of the Brethon Foundry and Machine-works in Tours, France. These experiments encouraged him to acquire the foundry and machine-works, so that Monsieur Brethon could retire. Emile soon entered his automobiles in the 1896 Paris–Marseille–Paris race, and the 1897 Paris–Dieppe race, followed in 1898 by the Marseilles–Nice rally, the Course de Périgeux, and the Paris–Amsterdam–Paris race.

Delahaye's automotive company was incorporated in 1898 with investors George Morane – who had driven one of Delahaye's cars in the Marseilles–Nice rally – and Morane's brother-in-law Leon Desmarais. The company moved its manufacturing from Tours to Paris, to a former hydraulic machinery plant owned by the Morane family. Charles Weiffenbach was made operations manager. The company initially produced three models at this location: the 1.4 litre single-cylinder Type 0, and the twin-cylinder  and Type 2. All three had bicycle-style tiller steering, rear-mounted water-cooled engines, automatic valves, surface carburetors, and trembler coil ignition; drive was a combination of belt and chain, with three forward speeds and one reverse.

Desmarais and Morane took control of the company when Émile Delahaye retired in 1901; Weiffenbach took over from them in 1906. The company ceased its participation in racing after Delahaye's death in 1905. Weiffenbach had no interest in racing, and focused on production of practical motorized automotive chassis, heavy commercial vehicles, and early firetrucks for the French government.

By 1904, about 850 automobiles had been built. The company introduced its first production four-cylinder in 1903 and shaft-drive transmissions in 1907. Delahaye's chief design-engineer Amédée Varlet invented and pioneered the V6 engine in the 1911 Type 44. Varlet also designed the Delahaye Titan marine engine, an enormous cast-iron multi-valve twin-cam four-cylinder engine that was fitted into purpose-built speedboat La Dubonnet, which briefly held the world speed record on water.

Licensing and collaborations
German manufacturer Protos began licensed production of Delahaye models in 1907, while in 1909, H. M. Hobson began importing Delahaye vehicles to Britain. US manufacturer White pirated the Delahaye design; the First World War interrupted efforts to recover damages. By the end of the war, Delahaye's major income was from manufacturing trucks.

Following the war, Delahaye attempted, in 1927, to increase profits by adopting a modest form of assembly-line production, in a tripartite agreement with FAR Tractor Company and Chenard & Walcker automakers, and Rosengart, an entry-level manufacturer of small family cars. However, the range of vehicles undertaken to produce was excessively extensive, too diverse, and totally devoid of practical standardization. The collaboration did not last long as shrinking sales volume threatened the company's survival. By 1931, the triumverate had disintegrated. It has been alleged that Weiffenbach met with his friend and competitor Ettore Bugatti, to seek his opinion on turning Delahaye around. In 1932, Desmarais's widow and majority shareholder, Madame Leon Desmarais, instructed Weiffenbach to develop a new, higher quality, and considerably sportier automotive-chassis line, with an appealingly distinctive appearance, improved horsepower, better handling, and a higher price-point. Delahaye was repositioned to appeal to a wealthier, younger, more sporting oriented customer base. Varlet was instructed to establish both the new drawing office, and the racing department, neither of which Delahaye ever had before. Weiffenbach hired Jean François, as Varlet's assistant, and the company's designer and chief engineer. Delahaye had escaped near disaster, to arise with virtually immediate success, in the new Type 134, followed almost immediately by the International speed record setting Type 138, and then the model that made Delahaye deservedly famous: the Type 135.

Return to racing
In 1934, Delahaye set eighteen class records at Montlhéry, in a specially-prepared, stripped and streamlined 18 Sport. The company also introduced the 134N, a 12cv car with a 2.15-litre four-cylinder engine, and the 18cv Type 138, powered by a 3.2-litre six-cylinder engine – both developed from their successful truck engines. In 1935, success in the Alpine Trial led to the introduction of the sporting Type 135 "Coupe des Alpes". By the end of 1935, Delahaye had won eighteen minor French sports car events and a number of hill-climbs, and came fifth at Le Mans. In 1936, Delahaye ran four  cars (based on the Type 135) in the Ulster TT, placing second to Bugatti, and entered four at the Belgian 24 Hours, finishing 2-3-4-5 behind an Alfa Romeo. Delahaye was able to leverage their racing success to acquire automaker Delage in 1935.

American heiress Lucy O'Reilly Schell paid the developmental costs for short "Competition Court" 2.70-metre-wheelbase Type 135 cars for rallying and racing. She purchased 12 of these, reserving half for her Ecurie Bleue amateur racing team.

In 1937, René Le Bègue and Julio Quinlin won the Monte Carlo Rally driving a Delahaye. Delahaye also ran first and second at Le Mans. Against the German government-sponsored juggernauts Mercedes-Benz and Auto Union, Delahaye entered the Type 145, powered by a complicated -litre V12. Dreyfus also scored a victory in the Ecurie Bleu Type 145 at Pau in 1938, using the model's fuel economy to beat the more powerful Mercedes-Benz W154. Another Type 145 finished third in the same race.

These victories combined with French patriotism ensured demand for Delahaye cars up until the German occupation of France during World War II. In early 1940, 100 Type 134N and Type 168 chassis were built and bodied by Renault as military cars under contract for the French army. The French government had ordered all private automobile production to cease in June 1939, but small numbers of cars continued to be built for the occupying German forces until at least 1942.

Post-war decline
After World War II, French luxury car makers struggled under the depressed economy. In 1947, 88% of Delahaye production was exported, primarily to French colonies in Asia and Africa. Delahaye's meagre production of 573 cars in 1948 (compared to 34,164 by market-leader Citroën), was unsustainably low.

The new face of the postwar Delahaye was styled in-house by industrial designer Philippe Charbonneaux. Production of the outdated pre-war Type 135 and 148L was resumed in 1946, to restart cash flow and because the Type 175 and its two longer-wheelbased versions were not ready for introduction. The Type 175 was very modern when it had been envisioned in 1938 but its production was delayed until 1948 due to the war, post-war shortages, and the death of its designer.

With a license agreement in place and no viable alternatives, Delahaye proceeded with production of the Type 175. However, suspension components underwent catastrophic failure, and Delahaye was obliged to buy back a number of its vehicles to avoid litigation. The risk of negative publicity was so great that the company kept no records of these events. The affair could not be effectively contained and resulted in disinterest among prospective buyers. The Type 175, 178 and 180 models were unable to generate enough sales to recover development and production costs. Their production was discontinued in mid-1951.

Until early 1951, continuing demand from the French army for the company's light reconnaissance vehicles (VLR) enabled the company to operate. A small demand for the Type 163 trucks allowed the business to remain solvent.

A one-ton capacity light truck (later sharing its 3.5-litre six-cylinder overhead-valve engine with the company's Type 235 luxury cars) made its debut at the 1949 Paris Motor Show as the Type 171. During the next twelve months the Type 171 spawned several brake-bodied versions, including ambulance and 9-seater "familiale" variants. The vehicle was intended for use in France's African colonies, having large wheels and high ground clearance, and was also exported to Brazil. By 1952, thirty Type 171s were produced per month.

Delahaye's last entirely new model, a 2-litre Jeep-like vehicle known as Delahaye VLR (Véhicule Léger de Reconnaissance Delahaye) was released in 1951. The French army believed that this vehicle offered a number of advantages over the traditional American-built Jeep of the period. During 1953, the company built 1,847 VLRs, as well as 537 "special" military vehicles. In that year no more than 36 Delahaye or Delage-branded passenger cars were registered.

In 1953, the Type 235 was introduced. Fernand Lecour, working with a small group of enthusiastic factory employees, convinced Weiffenbach to introduce an updated version of the Type 135, fitted with hydraulic instead of mechanical brakes, and a triple Solex carbureted version of the 3.6-litre Type 135 engine, which produced . This power was roughly equal to that of the previous series. Only 84 examples of the Type 235 were built.

Delahaye's main competitor, Hotchkiss, negotiated a licensing agreement with Kaiser-Willys Motors, and obtained sanction to manufacture its Willys MB 'Jeep' in France. The French army began to appreciate the simpler machine, available at a much lower price, and cancelled the contract for the more sophisticated Delahaye VLR. In August 1953, the company laid off more than 200 employees. A merger was discussed with Hotchkiss, which was facing similar problems. On 19 March 1954, an agreement was signed by Delahaye president Pierre Peigney and Hotchkiss president Paul Richard. Less than three months later, on 9 June, Delahaye shareholders accepted a takeover of Delahaye by Hotchkiss, after which Hotchkiss shut down Delahaye car production. By the end of 1954, after a brief period selling trucks with the Hotchkiss-Delahaye nameplate, the combined firm was itself taken over by Brandt. By 1956, the brands Delahaye, Delage, and Hotchkiss were no longer in use.

Ownership and administration

Emile Delahaye, a successful Tours foundry and machine works owner, built his first car in 1894. By 1898, the demand required that he expand facilities and obtain investment capital. Emile Delahaye agreed to partner equally with coppersmith business owners and brothers-in-law, Leon Desmarais and George Morane. The arrangement was duly incorporated in 1898, and car assembly was moved to the vacant Paris factory owned by the incoming partners. When Delahaye retired in 1901, from failing health, he sold his shares to his partners, with Desmarais purchasing more, thus gaining a majority. As the Desmarais and Morane families were connected by marriage, Delahaye was a family-owned business, from 1901 until its takeover by Hotchkiss in 1954. The board of directors was composed of the shareholders, plus their appointed manager of operations, Charles Weiffenbach, as chief executive officer.

Emile Delahaye had been the company's president, its sole engineer, and the administrator, until his retirement. In 1898, Delahaye hired Weiffenbach as his managerial assistant; and, Amédée Varlet as the company's design engineer. Both men were qualified mechanical engineers, with differing talents, and both stayed with the company for their entire career. Weiffenbach became the operations manager in 1906, while Varlet focused on technical engineering advancements and technical manufacturing advances. In 1932, 42-year-old Jean Francois was hired as chief design-engineer. Amadee Varlet was promoted to head up the new drawing office, and set up and manage the new racing department, assisted by much younger engineer Jean Francois.

Pierre Peigney, a family relative, was the president, but his was more a formal role, since it was Charles Weiffenbach who had been mandated by the partners to run the company, literally single-handedly.

This he did, including after orchestrating the merger in 1954 with Hotchkiss, a prime competitor.  President Peigney signed for Delahaye, and president Richard signed for Hotchkiss. Delahaye was the minority partner, but neither company had the strength and resources to avoid being absorbed by the gigantic Brandt group of companies. Delahaye was wound down on 31 December 1954, to vanish into extinction.

Notable models

 – 1895–1901
Delahaye 44 – 1911–1914 – first production V6
Delahaye 134 – 1933–1940
Delahaye 135 – 1935–1954
Delahaye 138
Delahaye 148
Delahaye 168 – 1938–1940
Delahaye 175 – 1948–1951
Delahaye 178
Delahaye 180
Delahaye 235 – 1951–1954
Delahaye VLR – 1951–1954

Gallery

References

Notes

Bibliography

External links

 Club Delahaye
 1949 Delahaye Roadster belonging to Diana Dors (BBC)
 December 1937 - Motorsport Magazine - A fine French Sports car: a test in difficult conditions of the 3-Litre Delahaye
 Scan of the article which appeared in December 1937 in the Motorsport Magazine 

Car manufacturers of France
Vehicle manufacturing companies established in 1894
Vehicle manufacturing companies disestablished in 1954
Defunct motor vehicle manufacturers of France
French racecar constructors

1894 establishments in France
Organizations based in Tours, France
Luxury motor vehicle manufacturers
1954 disestablishments in France
Companies based in Centre-Val de Loire
Sports car manufacturers
Truck manufacturers of France